Macaranga attenuata is a species of plant in the family Euphorbiaceae. It is endemic to French Polynesia.

References

Flora of French Polynesia
attenuata
Least concern plants
Taxonomy articles created by Polbot